The Radio and Television Personality (RTP) Awards are an annual awards ceremony for radio and television in Ghana.

The RTP Awards, organized by Big Events Ghana, were first announced in January 2011. The first RTP awards show was held in June 2011 at the Banquet Hall, State House, Accra. The event was hosted by Ama K. Abebrese and Felix Vander Pullin.

The 9th edition, hosted by actor James Gardiner and talk show host Cookie Tee, was held at the Accra International Conference Centre on October 12 2019.

References

Award ceremonies
Broadcasting in Ghana
Entertainment events in Ghana
2011 establishments in Ghana
Awards established in 2011